Alcock's Arabian (foaled about 1700, died about 1733), also known as Pelham Grey Arabian and less certainly as Bloody Buttocks and Ancaster Turk, among other names, is the ancestor of all grey-coloured Thoroughbred horses, as well as grey sport and riding horses descended from Thoroughbred lines.

Origins and career
It was claimed in the 19th century that Sir Robert Sutton (1671–1746), English ambassador to the Ottoman Empire in Constantinople from 1700 to 1717, had acquired horses there, including Alcock's Arabian, the Holderness Turk, and the Brownlow Turk, and had had them shipped to England in 1704. However, there is no evidence that Alcock's Arabian was among these horses. It is more likely that he was bred in England. Lady Wentworth of the Crabbet Arabian Stud researched the foundation sires and found some confusion due to horses' names changing as they changed owners. She eventually concluded that every imported grey stallion she could find sufficient information to review was the same horse as Alcock's Arabian. While it is true that the horse may have been known under several different names, including Pelham's Grey Horse, and Bloody Buttocks, if he was bred in England, as now believed, he could not have been the same horse as one imported. It has been claimed that the horse was imported early in the 18th century, but there is no firm evidence to support this assertion. The General Stud Book lists Sir Watkin Wynn's Spot, a horse now accepted as having been sired by Alcock's Arabian, as: "...by a son of the Curwen Bay Barb (which was out of Sir J. Parsons's Old Wen Mare, sister to Clumsey)...", which is strong evidence. The Old Wen Mare may have been the same mare as the exceptional broodmare Grey Wilkes, and if not was probably her full sister.

The horse is reported to have been folded in 1700. In any event, he was in England by 1704, ending up recorded in the General Stud Book in the hands of a man named Alcock who was a farmer and breeder in Lincolnshire. He became an influential stud in the early 1700s, and in 1722 Alcock sold him to the Duke of Ancaster.

Bloodlines and influence
The horse's sire line was significant through his son Crab (or "Old Crab"), who sired Ancaster's Grasshopper, Routh's Crab, Shepherd's Crab, Cumberland's Crab, Sloe, Rib, Wynn's Spot, Gentleman, Brilliant, Black and All Black, Imported Sober John, Berie's Ramper, and Spectator. The last of these was the sire of Sulphur, Damper, and Marc Anthony, who sired Aimwell (1782), winner of the Derby of 1785. Aimwell was the only winner of the Derby not in the sire line of one of the three great Arabian foundation stallions, the Godolphin Arabian, the Darley Arabian, and the Byerley Turk.

Although his sire line is extinct among Thoroughbreds, Alcock's Arabian is considered the ancestor of all grey Thoroughbred horses.  His status as the progenitor of all grey Thoroughbreds was the subject of a question on Episode 12 of Series H of the BBC comedy panel game QI.

Sire line tree

Alcock's Arabian
Tipler
Crab
Grey Ward
Crab (Routh)
Valiant
Rib
Sober John
Sloe
Sweeper
Bustard
Dorimond
Gamahoe
Othello (Portmore)
Allworthy
Locust
Oroonoko
Brunswick
Black-and-all-Black
Spectator
Pagan
Sulfur
Mark Anthony
Aimwell
Vandal
Brilliant
Antelope
Crab (Cumberland)
Milksop
Crab (Shepherd)
Lath (Protector)
Laburnum
Tippoo Saib
Othello (Kingston)
True Briton
Selim
Gentleman
Why Not

Notes

Individual Arabian and part-Arabian horses
1700 racehorse births
1730s racehorse deaths
Individual male horses